Marion Artemus “Bob” Speer (1885–1978) established the Western Trails Museum in 1936.  He was a lifetime collector of Native American and Old West artifacts, and author.  He built a building next to his house in Huntington Beach, California to house his collection and opened it to the public.  Twenty years later, he donated his collection to Knott’s Berry Farm, where it remains.

Lifelong collector
Speer was born the day after New Year's Day in 1885.  He spent his boyhood in Texas, where his grandparents had been pioneers.  He found his first Native American artifact at age four, which sparked an interest in collecting that continued for the rest of his life.    He devoted his free time to traveling in the West (nearly 250,000 miles) collecting historical items relating to pioneers and Native Americans, as well as geological specimens. 

He was educated as a mining engineer at the Colorado School of Mines, which is America's premier university in that field.  He initially could not afford to attend college, so he worked wherever he could, and saved his money.  Once he entered college he excelled, and caught the eye of a mining company, which offered to subsidize his education if he would work there after he graduated (which he did).  In 1917, he went to work for the Texas Company (Texaco), until his retirement in 1950.  He was a big part of the oil boom in Huntington Beach, California.
[[File:Irene Drake, docent, Western Trails Museum, Knott's Berry Farm, 1983.jpg|thumb|Irene Drake, docent, Western Trails Museum, original building at Knott's Berry Farm, 1983.  Courtesy of the Orange County Archives.<ref>Jennings, Jay.  Knott's Berry Farm: The Early Years, pp. 106-7, Arcadia Publishing, Charleston, South Carolina, 2009.  .</ref>]]

He spent his vacations exploring the West, and in 1931, he wrote a book on his travels, entitled Western Trails.“Western Trails,” Monrovia News-Post, p. 1, August 15, 1932, Monrovia, California.

Western Trails Museum
In 1936, Speer established the Western Trails Museum in a small building he erected next to his house at 7862 Speer Ave. (The street was named in his honor) in the Liberty Park section of Huntington Beach.  In 1941, a  addition to the museum was completed.  Funds for the addition were donated primarily by long-time friend, J. D. Luke and businessmen who were members of the Huntington Beach Chamber of Commerce."Rare Old Coins Displayed by Liberty Park Collector,” Santa Ana Register, p. 8, December 3, 1936, Santa Ana, California.“Relics of Western Trails Museum Trace Old Tales of the Pioneers,” Los Angeles Times, p. 161, March 6, 1955, Los Angeles, California.

Another addition was completed in the mid-1940s.  School groups and the general public would come to see his collection of 12,000 arrowheads, mineral specimens, fossils, guns, tools and other Old West artifacts.  It was said to be the largest private collection in existence.“Western Trails Museum is Outgrowth of Child's Hobby,” Santa Ana Register, p. 8, March 3, 1939, Santa Ana, California.

He always enjoyed excellent health, and said that he was never sick a day in his life.  He often got so wrapped up in his museum work that he only got two or three hours of sleep at night.

Knott's Berry Farm
From the very beginning, Speer was an enthusiastic supporter of Walter Knott's efforts to create Ghost Town at Knott’s Berry Farm, which began in 1940.  As early as 1941, Speer wrote articles for Ghost Town News,'' which was the Knott's Berry Farm newspaper.  In 1956, twenty years after creating his museum, Speer (at age 72) donated the carefully catalogued collection (which had grown to 30,000 items) to Knott's Berry Farm in return for Knott's housing it, displaying it and naming Speer as curator.  Speer continued in that position until he retired in 1969 at the age of 84. 

The museum was once housed in a building (which has since been razed) at Knott's Berry Farm between Jeffries Barn and the schoolhouse.  A year after acquiring the Speer collection, another noted museum collection, Mott's Miniatures came to Knott's.  The collection, which depicted American life from Pilgrim times to the present (with even a working two-inch-wide television set), was housed in Jeffrey's Barn.  The Western Trails Museum at Knott's is now just south of the saloon in Ghost Town.

Marion Speer died in Orange County in 1978, at the age of 93.

References

External links
Berry Farm Web site page with photo of museum

1885 births
1978 deaths
American collectors
Museum founders
Colorado School of Mines alumni